Rowing at the 2011 Southeast Asian Games was held at Lake Cipule, Karawang, West Java, Indonesia.

Medal summary

Medal table

Medalists

Men

Women

Results

Men

Single Sculls

Heats 
November 14

Repechages 
November 14

Finals 
November 16

Coxless pairs

Heats
November 14

Repechages
November 14

Finals
November 16

Lightweight coxless four

Heats
November 14

Finals
November 16

Women

Quadruple sculls

Heats
November 14

Finals
November 16

Coxless pairs

Heats
November 14

Finals
November 16

External links
 Start/Result - Rowing
 EVENTS LIST - Rowing

2011 Southeast Asian Games events
Southeast Asian Games
2011